Tubulin polymerization promoting protein family member 3 is a protein that in humans is encoded by the TPPP3 gene.

References

Further reading

External links 
 PDBe-KB provides an overview of all the structure information available in the PDB for Human Tubulin polymerization-promoting protein family member 3
 PDBe-KB provides an overview of all the structure information available in the PDB for Mouse Tubulin polymerization-promoting protein family member 3